Davit Gharibyan (Armenian: Դավիթ Ղարիբյան; born May 29, 1990 in Yerevan, Armenia) is an Armenian model, actor, director, host and publisher in music networks.

Biography

Davit Gharibyan was born on May 29, 1990 in Yerevan, Armenia. On 2007 he has graduated Khachatur Abovyan's number second school. Next to it he studied at State Engineering University of Armenia, as an engineer. On 2010 he also has graduated from Advances Academy of Yerevan of economical management, as a finances and credit specialist, as well as has graduated Yerevan State Song theatre, as a presenter and announcer of Shows. In 2011 he is doing his Master at Pedagogical University, as a director. Topic of the thesis was: "National Costumes in Mass Theatrical Celebrations."

On the 2013 is taken on as an applicant at the Art Institute of NAS RA on specialty "Fine art, decorative and applied arts, design."

Career
He was invited as a juri of beauty contests, took part in several films and music video clips and also announced several charitable concerts.

In December 2009 took part in the contest-festival "Best Model of the World XXII ", held in Sofia. In 2011 participated in contest-festival "International Best Male and Female Model World" and "Costa Blanca Fashion Week" representing Armenia and appear in Top 5.

On 2014 he became Mister Fashion Beauty Universal model competition's winner. There were 111 models from all over the world.

In 2016 he was invited to conduct professional training at the Top International Model of the World competition in Romania.

He is currently working at the Armenian Academic Opera and Ballet Theatre A. Spendiaryan as an actor.

Television

Modeling Competition-festival

Theatre

External links

Official website

Davit Gharibyan on Facebook
Davit Gharibyan on Twitter

References

1990 births
Living people
Male actors from Yerevan
Armenian male models
Models from Yerevan